The Dr. Wesley Blaisdell House (also known as the John Colvin Home) is a historic house located on South Main Street in Coeymans Landing, Albany County, New York.

Description and history 
It was built in 1838, and is a -story, three bay by three bay, Greek Revival style frame dwelling with a side hall plan. It has a temple front with a monumental two-story portico and picturesque two-story bay window added in the 1850s.

It was listed on the National Register of Historic Places on July 17, 2012.

References

Houses on the National Register of Historic Places in New York (state)
Greek Revival houses in New York (state)
Houses completed in 1838
Houses in Albany County, New York
National Register of Historic Places in Albany County, New York
1838 establishments in New York (state)
National Register of Historic Places in New York (state)